The 15th Sarasaviya Awards festival, presented by the Associated Newspapers of Ceylon Limited, was held to honor the best films of 1986 Sinhala cinema on July 25, 1987, at the Bandaranaike Memorial International Conference Hall, Colombo 07, Sri Lanka. Minister of Lands and Land Development Gamini Dissanayake was the chief guest at the awards night.

Even though the film Maldeniye Simieon won seven awards including Best Film, Best Director, Best Actor and Best Actress, most number of awards were received to the film Koti Waligaya which included eleven awards.

Awards

References

Sarasaviya Awards
Sarasaviya